The Beginning of the End... is the debut studio album by American hip hop group UTP. It was released on May 18, 2004 through Rap-A-Lot Records. Recording sessions took place at Stone House in Los Angeles, at Studio Center in Miami, and at UTP Studios in New Orleans. Production was handled by Derek "Grizz" Edwards, Slice Tee, Donald "XL" Robertson, Ad Future, and Juvenile. It features guest appearances from Partners-N-Crime, Ms. Tee and Big Zuse.

The album peaked at number 122 on the Billboard 200 and number 17 on the Top R&B/Hip-Hop Albums chart in the United States. The album produced two singles: "Nolia Clap" and "What's Up". Its lead single, "Nolia Clap", made it to number 31 on the Billboard Hot 100 and number 9 on both Hot R&B/Hip-Hop Songs and Hot Rap Songs. The album's chopped and screwed version was edited by OG Ron C.

Background 
The Beginning of the End... marked UTP's first studio album after having previously releasing two compilation albums in 2002 (The Compilation) and 2003 (Street Stories). Instead of using the UTP name, the trio was instead billed as Juvenile, Wacko & Skip in order to build off Juvenile's popularity.

Track listing

Personnel 
 Terius "Juvenile" Gray – main artist, producer, mixing, executive producer, A&R
 Damon "Wacko" Grison – main artist
 Clifford "Skip" Nicholas – main artist
 Walter "Kango" Williams – featured artist (tracks: 3, 7, 11, 13, 14)
 Trishell "Ms. Tee" Williams – featured artist (tracks: 13, 14)
 C. "Zuse" Winn – featured artist (track 13)
 Michael "Meanor" Patterson – featured artist (track 14)
 Adam "AD Future" Brumfield – producer
 Derek "Grizz" Edwards – producer
 Donald "XL" Robertson – producer
 Sheldon "Slice Tee" Arrington – producer
 James Prince – executive producer
 John "JP" Pegram – engineering
 Mac "Silencer" Jones – engineering
 Dave Junco – engineering, mixing
 Mike Dean – mixing, mastering
 Anzel "Red Boy" Jennings – A&R
 Aubrey Francis – project coordinator
 Paul Francis – project administrator
 Mark Hayes – art direction, design
 Mike Frost – photography

Charts

References

External links

2004 debut albums
UTP (group) albums
Rap-A-Lot Records albums